Walnut Hills may refer to:
Walnut Hills, Cincinnati, Ohio
Walnut Hills, Dayton, Ohio